Hidden Treasures Ruslan FM 95.2 Miss Nepal 2020, the 26th Miss Nepal beauty pageant, which was held on 5 December 2020 in Kathmandu, Nepal .  During the coronation night, four major winners was crowned as Miss World Nepal 2020, Miss Earth Nepal 2020, Miss International Nepal 2020 and Miss Supranational Nepal 2020. Miss Universe Nepal was removed as a new organisation was created to center on Miss Universe called Miss Universe Nepal which is under the national director who is Nepal's representative in Miss Earth 2012 and Miss Universe 2017, Nagma Shrestha.

The Top 5 winners of 2018 crowned their successors: Miss Nepal World 2019 Anushka Shrestha crowned Namrata Shrestha as Miss Nepal World 2020, Miss Nepal Earth 2019 Riya Basnet crowned Supriya Shrestha as Miss Nepal Earth 2020, Miss Nepal International 2019 Meera Kakshapati crowned Sandhya Sharma as Miss Nepal International 2020 and Chief Judge of Miss Nepal 2020 Meekha Mathema crowned Shimal Kanaujiya as Miss Nepal Supranational 2020.

In addition, the winners received Rs 250,000 as prize money for winning the title. The auditions of Miss Nepal were held from 8 to 24 March in Birtamode, Birgunj, Butwal, Chitwan, Dhangadhi, Dharan, Nepalgunj, Pokhara and Kathmandu along with one contestant from Livon Wild Card entry. 

Kantipur Television broadcast the pageant live for the Nepalese at home and abroad.

Results

Placements
Color key

The Big 5 main titles were awarded in the following order:

Special Awards

Judges
 Mr Sixit Bhatta - Founder of Tootle Nepal
 Mrs Tulika Agrawal - Executive Director of MAW Foundation Nepal
 Mr Karan Vaidya - Vice President of Vaidya Group
 Ms Nikita Chandak - Winner of Miss Nepal 2017 and Top 40 Semifinalist of Miss World 2017
 Dr. Pukar Malla - Founder and Chairperson of Daayitwa Nepal
 Dr. Raj Rana - Medical Superintendent of Nepal Mediciti Hospital
 Ms Priti Sitoula - Winner of Miss Nepal 2003
 Mr Suman Shakya - Founder of SmartPaani Nepal
 Mrs Swastima Khadka - Cine Artist of Nepali Cinema (Kollywood)
 Capt. Priya Adhikari - Helicopter Rescue Pilot
 Ms Meekha Mathema - Educationist

Contestants

(●) The winner of Livon Life Miss Popular Choice (online voting) got direct entry in Top 12 Semi-Finalists.

Previous Experience

 (#) Arnica Rajbhandari participated in Model Hunt Nepal 2017 and won the subtitle "Socially Responsible".
 (#) Junu Twayana competed in Miss Newa 1137.
 (#) Yojana Bhattarai was the winner of Miss Diva Nepal 2018.
 (#) Sajana Panta won Model Superstar Nepal Season 2.
 (#) Ayesha Shrestha was placed in the Top 5 in Miss Intercontinental Nepal 2017.
 (#) Rushmita Shahi was the winner of Princess Nepal 2014.
 (#) Namrata Shrestha was placed in the Top 5 in Miss Nepal 2016.
 (#) Pragati Shrestha was the winner of Miss BBA 2016.

References

External links
Miss Nepal Website
Miss Nepal Official Website

Beauty pageants in Nepal
2020 beauty pageants
2020 in Nepal
Miss Nepal